Bussock Camp is the site of an Iron Age bivallate hillfort located in Berkshire, England. It has a double bank and ditch to the south and east, with only a single bank remaining the north and western sides. The entrance is to the north of the site and is believed to be original, and the site encloses approximately 11 acres.

The site lies within a private estate on Phillip's Hill, and within Bussock Wood. There are various lanes and paths running through the wood, however none of them appear as public rights of way. There is a public bridle path that runs east to west, slightly to the south of the site. Apparently the site is accessible in May, when the woods are opened to the public to view the fine display of bluebells.

It is thought that the site was occupied as early as the 6th century BC, and probably supported a fluctuating population of up to 300 ancient Britons over several hundred years. Bussock Hill and Bussock Hill House are sited close by on a slightly separate prominence to the south-east.

Location
The site lies at a level of just over 145m AOD.

See also 
List of places in Berkshire
List of hill forts in England
List of hill forts in Scotland
List of hill forts in Wales

References

External links 
Bussock Camp at the Digital Hillfort Project



Hill forts in Berkshire
Chieveley
Scheduled monuments in Berkshire